Argon oxygen decarburization (AOD) is a process primarily used in stainless steel making and other high grade alloys with oxidizable elements such as chromium and aluminum. After initial melting the metal is then transferred to an AOD vessel where it will be subjected to three steps of refining; decarburization, reduction, and desulfurization.

The AOD process was invented in 1954 by the Lindé Division of The Union Carbide Corporation (which became known as Praxair in 1992).

Process
The AOD process is usually divided in three main steps: decarburization, reduction, and desulfurization.

Decarburization 
Prior to the decarburization step, one more step should be taken into consideration: de-siliconization, which is a very important factor for refractory lining and further refinement. 

The decarburization step is controlled by ratios of oxygen to argon or nitrogen to remove the carbon from the metal bath. The ratios can be done in any number of phases to facilitate the reaction. The gases are usually blown through a top lance (oxygen only) and tuyeres in the sides/bottom (oxygen with an inert gas shroud). The stages of blowing remove carbon by the combination of oxygen and carbon forming CO gas. 

4 Cr(bath) + 3 O2 → 2 Cr2O3(slag)

Cr2O3(slag) + 3 C(bath) → 3 CO(gas) + 2 Cr(bath)

To drive the reaction to the forming of CO, the partial pressure of CO is lowered using argon or nitrogen. Since the AOD vessel is not externally heated, the blowing stages are also used for temperature control. The burning of carbon increases the bath temperature. By the end of this process around 97% of Cr is retained in the steel.

Reduction 
After a desired carbon and temperature level have been reached the process moves to reduction. Reduction recovers the oxidized elements such as chromium from the slag. To achieve this, alloy additions are made with elements that have a higher affinity for oxygen than chromium, using either a silicon alloy or aluminum. The reduction mix also includes lime (CaO) and fluorspar (CaF2). The addition of lime and fluorspar help with driving the reduction of Cr2O3 and managing the slag, keeping the slag fluid and volume small.

Desulfurization 
Desulfurization is achieved by having a high lime concentration in the slag and a low oxygen activity in the metal bath. 

S(bath) + CaO(slag) → CaS(slag) + O(bath)

So, additions of lime are added to dilute sulfur in the metal bath. Also, aluminum or silicon may be added to remove oxygen. Other trimming alloy additions might be added at the end of the step. After sulfur levels have been achieved the slag is removed from the AOD vessel and the metal bath is ready for tapping. The tapped bath is then either sent to a stir station for further chemistry trimming or to a caster for casting.

References 

American inventions
Stainless steel
Steelmaking